Ana Manso (born 7 March 1966) is a Spanish gymnast. She competed in six events at the 1984 Summer Olympics.

References

1966 births
Living people
Spanish female artistic gymnasts
Olympic gymnasts of Spain
Gymnasts at the 1984 Summer Olympics
Sportspeople from Tarragona